Richard Joseph Harley (September 25, 1872 – April 3, 1952) was an American baseball outfielder, manager, and coach. 

A native of Philadelphia, Harley played baseball and American football at Georgetown University. He then played professional baseball from 1895 to 1909, including seven years in Major League Baseball for the St. Louis Browns (1897–1898), Cleveland Spiders (1899), Cincinnati Reds (1900–1901), Detroit Tigers (1902), and Chicago Cubs (1903). During his major league career, he appeared in 741 games and compiled a .262 batting average with 96 extra-base hits, 236 RBIs, and 78 times hit by pitch.

As an outfielder, he had a strong arm, led the National League in assists in 1898, and totaled at least 20 assists in four of his seven major league seasons. He also led all National League outfielders in errors with 27 in 1899 and 30 in 1901.

Harley later served as the player-manager of the Toronto Maple Leafs of the Eastern League (1904–1905) and as a college baseball coach for Georgetown (1913), Penn State (1915–1917), and Pittsburgh (1920–1924).

Early years
Harley was born in 1872 in Philadelphia. He grew up on his family's land named Boxwood Farm located in Whitpain Township located in the Blue Bell/Gwynedd Valley area northwest of the city.  

He attended Georgetown University, where he played both American football and baseball. He played at the fullback position on the football team in 1893. Although contemporary newspaper sources have not been found referring to him as a coach, modern Georgetown football media guides list Harley as the head coach of the 1893 Georgetown football team.  He played at the shortstop and left field on the baseball team in the spring of 1894.

Professional baseball

Minor leagues (1895-96)
Harley began playing professional baseball in 1895 for the Millville team in the South New Jersey League. He advanced to the Springfield Ponies of the Eastern League in 1896.

St. Louis and Cleveland (1897-99)
On May 29, 1897, he was traded by the Philadelphia Phillies with Bill Hallman to the St. Louis Browns in exchange for Tommy Dowd. At the time, The Philadelphia Inquirer noted that, while Harley was drawing "a big salary for a young player", he was "worth every cent he draws. That boy is a comer, if there ever was one." Harley made his major league debut on June 2, 1897, with the Browns. On June 24, 1897, he collected six hits in a 12-inning game played at Pittsburgh. During the 1897 season, he hit .288 in 90 games for the Browns. The following year, he appeared in 142 games for the Browns, but his batting average dropped by more than 40 points to .246. He was hit by a pitch for a career high 22 times in 1898. He also led all National League outfielders in 1898 with 26 assists and ranked second with 27 errors.

Prior to the start of the 1899 season, the St. Louis Browns baseball club was acquired by the owners of the Cleveland Spiders. On March 29, 1899, Harley was assigned by the St. Louis club to the Spiders. He appeared in 142 games for the 1899 Spiders and compiled a .250 batting average with a career-high 50 RBIs. He was the starting left fielder for the 1899 Cleveland Spiders, who some consider to be the worst team in baseball history. The Spiders went 20–134, scoring 529 runs and allowing 1,252 runs. Harley led all National League outfielders in 1899 with 27 errors.

Detroit and Cincinnati (1900-02)
On April 3, 1900, the Detroit Tigers purchased four former Spiders: Harley, Sport McAllister, Harry Lochhead, and Suter Sullivan. (The Tigers were part of the American League in 1900, but the league was not recognized as a major league until 1901.)  Harley appeared in 123 games for the 1900 Tigers and led the team with a .325 batting average, 77 runs scored, and 47 stolen bases. 

In September 1900, after the Tigers had completed their season, Harley joined the Cincinnati Reds. He appeared in five games and hit .428. However, he remained the property of the Tigers. In October 1900, Detroit club owner James D. Burns announced that he had rejected an offer of $2,000 to sell Harley, but he would sell for $3,000. One week after Burns' statement, the Reds purchased Harley from Detroit, reportedly for the $3,000 demanded by Burns.

Harley appeared in 133 games in the outfield for the 1901 Reds. He hit .273 during the 1901 season and led all National League outfielders with 30 errors. He also had 37 stolen bases in 1901, ranking fourth in the National League.

Prior to the 1902 season, Harley left the Reds and rejoined the Detroit Tigers. He appeared in 125 games for the 1902 Tigers, compiling a .281 batting average with 44 RBIs. He also led the American League in 1902 having been hit by a pitch 12 times.

Chicago Cubs (1903)
In early October 1902, Harley signed with the Chicago Cubs for the 1903 season, jumping back to the National League. Chicago manager Frank Selee moved Harley from left field to right field and said: "Harley always appealed to me as a player of more than ordinary intelligence . . . Harley is a natural hitter, is fast on the bases, can throw well, and uses good judgment in everything he does. I feel certain that he will make a success of right field, and that the team will be stronger for having him there." 
In 104 games for the 1903 Cubs, Harley hit .231. The 1903 season was Harley's last in the major leagues.

Major league overview
In his seven seasons in the major leagues, Harley appeared in 740 games, all but two as an outfielder, including 539 in left field, 106 in right field, and 93 in center field. He had a career batting average of .262 and an on-base percentage of .332 with 755 hits, 389 runs scored, 236 RBIs, 106 extra-base hits, 229 bases on balls, 139 stolen bases, and 78 times hit by a pitch.

Return to minors (1904-09)
During the 1904 and 1905 seasons, Harley was a player-manager for the Toronto Maple Leafs of the Eastern League. He also played in 1905 and 1906 for Providence in the Eastern League. He concluded his playing career playing for the Trenton Tigers (1907), Louisville Colonels (1908), and Reading of the Atlantic League (1909).

Later years
After retiring as a player, Harley was a baseball coach at Georgetown (1913), Penn State (1915–1917), Pittsburgh (1920–1924), and Villanova. He was also in the restaurant business.

In 1952, Harley died at his home in Philadelphia. He was survived by two daughters. He was buried at Old Cathedral Cemetery in Philadelphia.

Head coaching record

Football

See also

 List of Major League Baseball single-game hits leaders

References

External links

1872 births
1952 deaths
19th-century baseball players
Major League Baseball left fielders
Chicago Cubs players
Cincinnati Reds players
Cleveland Spiders players
Detroit Tigers players
St. Louis Browns (NL) players
Detroit Tigers (Western League) players
Louisville Colonels (minor league) players
Millville (minor league baseball) players
Philadelphia Athletics (minor league) players
Providence Clamdiggers (baseball) players
Providence Grays (minor league) players
Springfield Ponies players
Toronto Maple Leafs (International League) players
Toronto Maple Leafs (International League) managers
Trenton Tigers players
Georgetown Hoyas baseball coaches
Penn State Nittany Lions baseball coaches
Pittsburgh Panthers baseball coaches
Villanova Wildcats baseball coaches
Baseball players from Philadelphia
Burials in Pennsylvania